Olga Kay (born Olga Sergeyevna Karavaeva; ; November 20, 1982) is a Russian-American Internet celebrity (mainly known as a YouTube personality), performer and entrepreneur. Trained as a professional circus juggler in her youth, she later moved to acting and video creation. In 2006 she started the YouTube channel OlgaKay, creating shows such as Emo Girl and Olga Kay's Show. Adding channels on gaming and fashion, by 2013 her four combined channels had approximately a million subscribers.

She has appeared in Web shows such as MyMusic and The Annoying Orange, and hosted the Rogue Pictures Web show Tube Top, as well as collaborating with entertainers such as Joe Nation and Shane Dawson.

In 2014, Kay's YouTube Channel was listed on New Media Rockstars Top 100 Channels, ranked at #47.

In 2014, Kay launched her media and retail company Moosh Walks, to encourage an entrepreneurial spirit in her female fan base.

As of March 2016, Kay finalized her naturalization as an American citizen, thus holding dual citizenship.

Early life
Olga Karavaeva was born on November 20, 1982 in Stepne, Ukrainian SSR, Soviet Union (now Crimea). She performed professionally with a circus in Moscow as a teenager, before moving to the United States to work with the Ringling Brothers Circus.

Career

Performing, internet channels
After settling in Los Angeles, around 2004 she acted and juggled in television shows such as CSI: NY and The Benvenuti Family. She also started attending various YouTube events, co-promoting her online videos with other YouTubers such as Shay Carl, SxePhil, and CTFxC. In 2006 she started her YouTube comedy channel Olga Kay, followed in 2009 Olga Kay 2, which focuses on behind-the-scenes videos. Among her recurring shows are Olga Kay's Show and Emo Girl, where she plays a comedic emo version of herself known as Razor Blade. She later developed a third channel, Olga Kay Games, which presents video games in a comedic way.

Her fourth channel Mooshville is focused on fashion and beauty, with the brand name Moosh stemming from a nickname for her cat. Mooshville features What’s in my Purse?, filmed at the YouTube sound stage in Playa Vista, California, and the Pajama Party show, a makeup review show that has had guests such as Hannah Hart, Taryn Southern and Shane Dawson. Moosh is also the name of a custom brand of shoes named Mooshoos, which she created using feedback from fans.

The YouTube channels have approximately 1.2 million subscribers combined, as of July 2015.

On October 31, 2015, Olga started her successful series Will It Juggle?, which she announced at the first annual Stream Con NYC. In the series, she takes viewers' suggestions of items to juggle, usually succeeding due to her circus roots.

Collaborations
Kay has appeared as herself in a number of documentaries and webisodes, including the feature film Butterflies in 2009. In 2011 she had appearances in Shane Dawson TV, JoeNationTV,  The Annoying Orange, and in 2012 acted in YouTube's original channel initiative show MyMusic as a raver character.  She hosted the Rogue Pictures web show Tube Top, which recognizes the top shows/videos on YouTube.

She appeared in some Your Grammar sucks videos by Jack Douglass and collaborated with him on the short comedy video "Olga Kay: How to control your dreams!" in 2011, and in 2012 Toby Turner starred in a short with Kay entitled "Olga Kay Goes Haywire."

She has performed at VidCon and was interviewed in the podcasts New Mediacracy and Rhett and Link's Ear Biscuits. Brands she has worked with include Microsoft, Ford, Google, Relativity Media, Axe, Capcom, Nintendo, Virgin Mobile, Xbox, and others.

Business
Kay launched Moosh Walks, a media and retail brand that aims to empower young girls through storytelling, primarily about leadership. In 2014, Kay released her first characters as a line of 3D socks. The knee high socks feature numerous character designs and external ears. Kay said she created socks with ears because she didn't want to be another YouTuber with a logo on a T-shirt. Kay immediately recouped her initial investment in manufacturing the socks through a pre-order campaign. Moosh Walks were featured in the style lounge at the 2015 Emmy Awards. As of January 2016, Kay now has unisex socks and baby socks, and is developing pillows in collaboration with Throwboy. In 2017, Kay introduced a new sock character, Mushka, based on her cat and the inspiration for her brand name.

In 2018, Moosh Walks was featured as one of the top women owned business on Amazon.

Filmography

Film and TV

Web

References

External links

OlgaKay on Flickr
Official YouTube Channels
OlgaKay (main)
OlgaKay2 (behind-the-scenes)
OlgaKayGames (video game review)
Mooshville (fashion, beauty)

1982 births
Living people
Russian women comedians
Russian emigrants to the United States
Russian expatriates in the United States
Russian YouTubers
Video bloggers
Russian film actresses
Russian television actresses
21st-century Russian actresses
Russian cinematographers
Russian film directors
Russian women film directors
American women bloggers
Russian bloggers
American bloggers
Russian women bloggers
People from Crimea
21st-century American women
Russian businesspeople in the United States
American video bloggers
Russian video bloggers